The 2021–22 Serie A (known as the Serie A TIM for sponsorship reasons) was the 120th season of top-tier Italian football, the 90th in a round-robin tournament, and the 12th since its organization under an own league committee, the Lega Serie A. Inter Milan were the defending champions.

On 22 May 2022, following victory in their final match against Sassuolo, AC Milan were crowned champions for the first time since the 2010–11 season, earning a nineteenth overall title.

Teams 
Twenty teams competed in the league—the top seventeen teams from the previous season and three teams promoted from the Serie B.

Crotone, Benevento (both relegated after only one year in the top flight) and Parma (relegated after three years in the top flight) were relegated to the 2021–22 Serie B.

On 4 May 2021, Empoli secured promotion to Serie A after a two-year absence. Six days later, Salernitana officially confirmed a return to the top flight after 22 years of absence. The final team to be promoted were Venezia, who defeated Cittadella on 27 May in the final of the promotion play-offs, returning to the top flight after a nineteen-year absence.

Stadiums and locations

Number of teams by region

Personnel and kits

Managerial changes

League table

Results

Season statistics

Top goalscorers

1 Vlahović played for Fiorentina until matchday 23 and scored 17 goals.

Hat-tricks

Notes
4 Player scored 4 goals(H) – Home team(A) – Away team

Top assists

Clean sheets

Discipline

Player
 Most yellow cards: 14
 Maxime Lopez (Sassuolo)
 Gianluca Mancini (Roma)

 Most red cards: 2
 Kelvin Amian (Spezia)
 Ethan Ampadu (Venezia)
 Theo Hernandez (AC Milan)
 Leo Skiri Østigård (Genoa)
 Roberto Soriano (Bologna)
 Adama Soumaoro (Bologna)
 Nicolò Zaniolo (Roma)

Team
 Most yellow cards: 106
Venezia
 Most red cards: 9
Venezia
 Fewest yellow cards: 63
Napoli
 Fewest red cards: 1
Inter Milan
Juventus

Awards

Monthly awards

Seasonal awards

References

External links

Official website
Serie A at ESPN.com

 

Serie A seasons
Italy
1